Liquid Candy: How Soft Drinks are Harming Americans' Health is a report published by the Center for Science in the Public Interest (CSPI) which examines the increasing levels of soft drink consumption in the United States, particularly by children and teenagers, and the health problems this poses. Originally published in 1998, a second edition containing updated data was released in 2005.

As well as discussing a selection of the health disorders connected with soft drinks, such as tooth decay, obesity, diabetes, osteoporosis and kidney stones, the report also looks at the reduced nutritional intake resulting from soft drinks displacing other more nutritious food and drink. While its main focus is on sweeteners such as sugar and high-fructose corn syrup, brief attention is given to other common soft drink additives such as caffeine, artificial colorings, and artificial sweeteners.

Liquid Candy also explores the marketing and labeling of soft drinks, and ends with a number of recommendations for action, including: calling for the declaration of soft drink caloric content on restaurant menus; aggressive placement of water fountains, especially in schools; stopping the sale and advertising of soft drinks in schools; requiring medical professionals to routinely ask their patients about their soft drink consumption level; and levying taxes on soft drink sales to pay for mass-media campaigns to improve diet and promote physical activity.

In connection with the 2005 republication of the report, the CSPI filed a petition with the Food and Drug Administration, and also organized for a letter, signed by over 40 scientists, health professionals and organizations, to be sent to the United States Secretary of Health and Human Services.

See also
Cancer from diet
Junk food
Obesity in the United States
Sugary drinks tax

References

External links
 Michael F Jacobson PhD, Liquid Candy: How Soft Drinks are Harming Americans' Health, (2nd Ed., 2005). Free PDF version of the report (718kb).
 Liquid Candy home page (CSPI website)
 CSPI Newsroom: CSPI Calls on FDA to Require Health Warnings on Sodas (13 July 2005)
 Tatiana Morales, Warning Labels On Soda? Consumer Group Says Warnings May Help Curb Childhood Obesity, CBS News. Published 14 July 2005. Accessed 8 April 2009.
The Global Dump Soft Drinks Campaign (CSPI & International Association of Consumer Food Organizations project)

Soft drinks
Food and drink in the United States